Turley Publications Inc. is a privately owned commercial printer and publisher of more than a dozen weekly newspapers based in Palmer, Massachusetts, United States.

Patrick and Thomas Turley founded the company in 1962 when they purchased the Palmer Journal & Monson Register.

In 2004, Turley Publications invested in a digital prepress system; the company also runs its own mail room, including in-plant postal verification, and a bindery.

Properties 
In addition to printing several other companies' publications—such as the weeklies of Holden Landmark Company and New England Business Media LLC, and student papers at several New England colleges and universities—Turley is the dominant publisher of 15 community weekly newspapers in the suburbs and rural towns between Springfield and Worcester, Massachusetts. Turley weeklies reach about 130,000 homes in 60 towns. Turley-owned newspapers include:
 Agawam Advertiser News of Agawam
 Barre Gazette of Barre, Hubbardston, New Braintree, Oakham and Petersham
 Chicopee Register of Chicopee
 Country Journal of Huntington
 The Holyoke Sun of Holyoke
 The Journal Register of Brimfield, Holland, Monson, Palmer and Wales
 Quaboag Current of East Brookfield, New Braintree, North Brookfield, Warren and West Brookfield
 The Register of Ludlow
 The Sentinel of Amherst, Belchertown and Granby
 Southwick Suffield News of Southwick, Massachusetts, and Suffield, Connecticut
 The Tantasqua Town Common of Brimfield, Brookfield, Holland, Sturbridge and Wales
 Town Reminder of South Hadley
 Ware River News of Ware
 The Wilbraham-Hampden Times of Hampden and Wilbraham

The company also prints a shopper in the Palmer area, the Shopping Guide, and a monthly newspaper, the New England Antiques Journal, which has a national circulation, though mainly in New England

References

External links 
 Turley Publications Website

Newspapers published in Massachusetts
Mass media in Hampden County, Massachusetts